The Luzon shrew (Crocidura grayi) is a species of mammal in the family Soricidae. It is endemic to the Philippines.

References

Sources

Crocidura
Mammals of the Philippines
Endemic fauna of the Philippines
Fauna of Luzon
Fauna of Mindoro
Fauna of Catanduanes
Mammals described in 1890
Taxonomy articles created by Polbot